Percival Mallon Symonds (April 18, 1893 – August 6, 1960) was an American educational psychologist. He was known for his development of several tests in the fields of educational, clinical, and school psychology, including the Foreign Language Prognosis Test, the Personality Survey, and the Symonds picture-study test, a projective test administered to adolescents.

Early life and education 
Symonds was born on April 18, 1893 in Newtonville, Massachusetts. He received his B.A. from Harvard University in 1915, followed by an A.M. and Ph.D. from Columbia University in 1920 and 1923, respectively.

Career 
Symonds was a professor of education and psychology at the University of Hawaii from 1922 to 1924. In 1924, he began teaching at the Teachers College, Columbia University, where he remained a faculty member until his retirement in 1958. He died on August 6, 1960 in Salem, Massachusetts.

He served as the first chairman of the American Association of Applied Psychologists' Education Section and, from 1947 to 1948, as president of the American Psychological Association's Division of Educational Psychology. He was also president of the American Educational Research Association from 1956 to 1957.

Research 
Symonds researched the relationship between personality traits in teachers and their teaching abilities. His work, which included twenty-one books and over two hundred articles, emphasized the importance of dynamic psychology.

References

1893 births
1960 deaths
People from Newton, Massachusetts
Educational psychologists
20th-century American psychologists
Harvard University alumni
Columbia University alumni
University of Hawaiʻi faculty
Teachers College, Columbia University faculty
Psychometricians